Baka, baká or BAKA may refer to:

Ethnicities and languages
 Baka people (Cameroon and Gabon), an African ethnic group
 Baka people (Congo and South Sudan), an African ethnic group
 Baka language, a dialect cluster of Cameroon and Gabon
 Baka language (South Sudan), a Central Sudanic language of South Sudan

People with the name 
 Józef Baka, 18th century poet, Jesuit priest and missionary
 Latifa Baka (born 1964), Moroccan author
 Bikheris or Ba-Ka, Fourth Dynasty Egyptian pharaoh
 Baka (prince), Fourth Dynasty Egyptian prince who might be the above-named Bikheris
 Baka Prase (born 1996), Serbian YouTuber, rapper, gamer and entertainer

Fictional and mythical characters
 Bakasura, a mythical demon in the Mahabharata also known as Baka
 Baka Brahma, a deity in Buddhism - see Brahmā (Buddhism)
 Bākā, a character from Juken Sentai Gekiranger
 Cirno, a fictional character from the Touhou Project who is often referred to by its fans and creator as "baka"

Places
 Baka, Burkina Faso, a village in Gnagna Province
 Baka, Iran, a village in Hormozgan Province
 Baka, Jerusalem, a neighborhood in southern Jerusalem, Israel
 Baka, Slovakia, a village in Dunajská Streda District
 Bakkah, also transliterated Baka, another name for Mecca, Saudi Arabia
 Baká, one of the municipalities of Nicaragua

Other uses
Baka (Japanese word), meaning "fool; idiot; foolish", and which applies to:
Yokosuka MXY-7 Ohka, or Baka, Japanese suicide planes
 BAKA, the Muslim chaplain service of the Royal Malaysian Police
 Baka indigobird (Vidua larvaticola), a variant spelling of barka indigobird, an African species of bird
 Baka, the 1990 debut album of the world-music group Outback (group)

See also
 The Baka Boyz (Nick and Eric Vidal), nationally syndicated radio hosts in the US
 Baka Rangers, a group of Negima! Magister Negi Magi characters
 Bakas, a village in Uttar Pradesh, India
 Amalia Bakas (1897–1979), Greek singer born Mazaltov Matsa
 Rifaiz Bakas (born 1982), Dutch former cricketer

Language and nationality disambiguation pages